Han Chinese chauvinism is a political ideology that speaks out for the ethnic Han Chinese people and its uniqueness throughout human history. It differs from Chinese chauvinism, because it is only used in reference to people who are of Han Chinese ethnicity, the main ethnicity of China. Han chauvinists believe that the current influence from the West has downgraded the development of China's own cultural customs, and in response, it has become instrumental in leading the increasingly traditionalist movement, which was launched in 2001. Participants come together both online and in person in cities across China to revitalize their vision of the authentic “Great Han” and corresponding “real China” through traditional ethnic dress and Confucian ritual.

History

Han Chinese nationalism has a historic root of being focused on the Han Chinese people, the dominant and oldest ethnic group in China. Han Chinese nationalism had been often used as a rallying force stemming the historical pride of Han Chinese people and the way it developed to become one of the world's earliest civilizations.

Since the Han dynasty, ideas of Han Chinese nationalism has appeared when China started to adopt ethnic minorities, Han were called "Huaxia" at the time. The Han people called themselves "Han" since the Southern and Northern Dynasties to commemorate the Han Dynasty and then distinguish it from the Northern nomadic peoples.

Mao Zedong first criticized Han chauvinism in 1938 and these criticisms continued throughout his rule. For example, Mao's 1956 speech On the Ten Major Relationships emphasizes the need to oppose Han chauvinism.

The Chinese Communist Party (CCP)'s notions of China as a multicultural state have been subjected to criticism by the western media. Many policies have been made to give privileges to minority ethnicities, leading to legal inequality.

CCP former leader Deng Xiaoping also criticized Han chauvinism.

The current CCP general secretary Xi Jinping has officially criticized Han chauvinism. However, the Chinese Dream, a core concept of Xi is believed by some to have nationalistic dimensions.

In ethnic relations
Although the current Chinese government has largely attempted to promote the idea of a multiethnic nationalism instead of a singular ethnic nationalism, individuals have pointed about the lack of an agreed-upon definition of Chinese nationalism may have impacted on China's political decision with regard to other non-Han people and non-Chinese nations.

Tibetans
Since 1950, controversy has existed due to the view that Tibet was historically a feudal region which practiced serfdom/slavery and that this only changed due to communist influence in the region in order to liberate the Tibetans.

Xinjiang
Since 1758, the region of Xinjiang have had issues with government policy, which further extended to ethnic relations. Han and Hui people often live closer to Uighurs and stereotypes were developed.

Mongols
Mongols have been perceived to be better integrated into the society than that of Uyghurs and Tibetans. However, there were ethnic tensions and stereotypes.

Relationship to Chinese nationalism

Han nationalism and Chinese nationalism (as well as Han Chinese chauvinism and Chinese chauvinism) are different in terms of ideology, with the latter frequently focusing on a more multi-ethnic form of nationalism. There were a significant and large group of proponents of a multi-ethnic form of Chinese nationalism along with other scholars as well.

The multifaceted image of Han Chinese nationalism further developed during the buildup to modern Chinese statehood. Han Chinese nationalism also played a part in World War II, when the Second Sino-Japanese War occurred, where the Han Chinese people frequently suffered, and fought, against the Japanese.

See also
 
 Sinicization
 Hua–Yi distinction
 Chinese imperialism
 Sinocentrism

References

Chauvinism
Ethnocentrism
Chauvinism
Racism in China
Nationalism in China
Han
Politics of China